Igwe Iwuchukwu (Ezeifekaibeya, 1855-1904)  was the 17th Obi of Otolo and Igwe of Nnewi kingdom in the present day Anambra state of Nigeria. He is the traditional supreme ruler and spiritual leader in Nnewi, an Igbo city in Nigeria. He is a member of the Nnofo Royal lineage and the successor to his father Igwe Okafo. Unlike most Igbo monarchies, there were kings of Nnewi before the arrival of Europeans.

He sat on the throne of his ancestors until his death in 1904, the same year that the British colonists arrived at Nnewi.
The kingdom was mourning the passing of the King and one of the most influential Chiefs and brother of the late king, Nwosu Odumegwu (Eze Odumegwu), was asked to be the Warrant chief of Nnewi by the British Colonial Administration led by Major Moorehouse; he refused.

Reign 

His reign saw the expansion of Nnewi kingdom through wars and slave trade with the Aros. It was during his reign that that fought the Ubaru War. Led by Nsoedo who bore before him the charmed gourd, the Enems marched to the obi of Eze Ifekaibeya . There, they were joined by the Nnofo troops and, led still by the same Nsoedo carrying the same gourd, they all marched towards úbárú. On their arrival, they discovered that the enemy's defenses were solid and difficult to penetrate . This was the time when Nsoedo invoked, it is said, through the charmed gourd the gods of Umu Enem and, through their aid, presumably, the Otolo troops broke through. The Ubarus were annihilated though among the losses suffered by the Otolos was the death of Obi Mmaduabum, a relative of Dala Oliaku.

The Ubaru War had some remarkable results. At its conclusion, every Otolo man who took part in it took a hero's name . Some of these were Eze Obiukwu of Udude who became known as Ogbujulukpa; Nsoedo, the okúkú carrier and native of Egbu Umu Enem became Ochibilogbuo; Unaegbu of the same Egbu became Ogbuotaba and Eze Udenyi, relative of Eze Odumegwu who became also Kwambákwáisi. Eze Onyejemeni's success in Ubaru War and his successes in
others were to him a justification for the assumption of Onuo ora title. To
mark the glorious end of this war, a big rattle was prepared and left at the Eze Ifekaibeya’s obi then opened.

Upon his death, his young son Eze ugbonyamba alias (Igwe Orizu I) became the 18th Igwe of Nnewi in 1904. Nigerian politician and educationist Nwafor Orizu is his grandson and the current Igwe of Nnewi, Kenneth Onyeneke Orizu III is his great-grandson.

Family 

The following were the wives of Eze Ifekaibeya - (i) Mgbafo Eze Kwenna (ii) Uduagu (iii) Nwakaku Onwusilikam (iv) Afiazu (v) Nonu (vi) Mmegha (vii) Ukonnwa.  Among his issues were Eze Ugbonyamba his first son, Eze Nnaweigbo the son of Mmegha, Eze Enefeanya alias Oji, and Ofodile who was of the same mother with Eze Ugbonyamba.

See also
Hugh Trenchard in Nigeria

References

Igbo monarchs
Nnewi monarchs
Nigerian traditional rulers
People from Nnewi
1904 deaths
1855 births